The Vanguardia Popular Socialista (VPS, Popular Socialist Vanguard) was a far-right Chilean political party created in 1938. It was the direct heir of the National Socialist Movement of Chile (MNS) and founded as a consequence of the failed fascist coup in 1938 and its repression. It included Jorge González von Marées, while former MNS member Carlos Keller refused to join it. The VPS obtained 2,5% at the 1941 legislative elections, having two deputies elected, one of them being Jorge González von Marées.

The VPS was dissolved in 1942, the majority of its members joining Juan Gómez Millas' far-right .

References 

Antisemitism in Chile
Political parties established in 1939
Political parties disestablished in 1942
Defunct political parties in Chile
Fascist parties in Chile
Presidential Republic (1925–1973)
1939 establishments in Chile
1942 disestablishments in Chile